was the perpetrator of the  in Hikari, Yamaguchi, Japan, on 14 April 1999. On that day, when he was 18 years and 1 month old, he killed a woman (then 23 years old) and then performed necrophilia on the body, and also killed her daughter , and stole their wallet. He was charged with rape, murder and robbery, and was handed the death sentence although he was not of the age of maturity (20 years of age in Japan) at that time (18 years and 1 month). The appeal was rejected.

During the trial, the brutality of the details of the incident and the demands by the defense lawyers that teenagers ought not receive the death sentence were widely reported in mass media, sparking a debate within Japan.

References

Japanese people convicted of murder
Year of birth missing (living people)
Living people
Necrophiles
Japanese murderers of children
Hikari, Yamaguchi